The Guvnors is a 2014 British crime film directed by Gabe Turner. Former football hooligan Cass Pennant was involved in producing the film.

Plot
Mitch, is the ex-leader of a London firm known as The Guvnors who has walked away from his life of violence and more than 20 years later is happily married. He becomes concerned when his son starts to show violent tendencies through his behavior at school. He is challenged by Adam Shanko, a local gangster, after Shanko learns of the reputation of The Guvnors. Shanko is then humiliated at the hands of another former Guvnor, Mickey. This leads to brutal retaliation and a reuniting of The Guvnors, which reignites gangland warfare spanning two generations of families.

Cast 

 Doug Allen as Mitch                       
 Harley Sylvester as Adam 
 David Essex as Mickey Snr
 Vas Blackwood as Bill
 Jay Simpson as Neil  
 Jumayn Hunter as Woods
Martin Hancock as DC Meyler
Richard Blackwood as PC Benson
Charley Palmer Merkell as Trey 
Barrington Patterson as Baz 
Tony Denham as Trent 
Melanie Gutteridge as Angie
Paul Reynolds as Tone

Reception 
On review aggregator Rotten Tomatoes, the film holds an approval rating of 38% based on 8 reviews, with an average rating of 4.75/10. Mike McCahill, film critic of The Guardian gave the film 2/5 stars saying the film "treats one-time football hooligans as if they were Camelot knights, and features a twinkly David Essex".

References

External links

2014 films
2014 crime drama films
Black British films
British crime drama films
Films set in London
2010s English-language films
2010s British films